Cypress Chapel Christian Church is a church in Suffolk, Virginia.

Cypress Chapel was founded in 1746 and was among the first churches to participate in the Restoration Movement. It was the location of the first regular session of the Southern Christian Convention, which met May 5–8, 1858. Cypress Chapel is a member of the Conservative Congregational Christian Conference.

References

Churches in Suffolk, Virginia
Restoration Movement
1746 establishments in Virginia
Religious organizations established in 1746